San Diego de Alejandría is a town and municipality, in Jalisco in central-western Mexico. The municipality covers an area of 359.95 km².

As of 2005, the municipality had a total population of 6181.

References

Municipalities of Jalisco